Centreville is a census-designated place (CDP) in Fairfax County, Virginia, United States and a suburb of Washington, D.C. The population was 73,518 as of the 2020 census.

History

Colonial period
Beginning in the 1760s, the area was known as Newgate due to the popularity of the conveniently located Newgate tavern. William Carr Lane operated the tavern and was co-proprietor of a nearby store with James Lane, Jr. The Lanes sold convicted servants, which may explain why the tavern had the same name as a London prison. The small stream that passed near the tavern was named the River Thames, another London association. Another reason for it being named Newgate, was the fact that it was a "new gate" to the western territories.

Federal period
The town of Centerville (shortly thereafter spelled Centreville) was established in 1792 on the turnpike road at the village of Newgate by the Virginia General Assembly in response to petitions by local landowners. The petitioners reasoned that a town on the turnpike road leading from the Northwest Territory and centrally located to Alexandria, Colchester, Dumfries, Middleburg, George Town (later Georgetown), Fauquier Court House (later Warrenton), and Leesburg would be convenient. The town acquired its name due to its central location. James Hardage Lane, one of the landowners, conceived the idea of the town as a way to provide financial support to his widow and their children. At the town's inception, it was within the boundary of Loudoun County, Virginia, and became part of Fairfax County, Virginia, in 1798 when the boundary between the two counties shifted.

Town development established a pattern of mixed residential and commercial use. Frame houses, several taverns, stores, blacksmith shops, tanyards, and a school house were constructed on the 1/2-acre town lots.

American Civil War

In the American Civil War, several battles were fought nearby including the First Battle of Manassas, the Second Battle of Manassas, and the Battle of Chantilly. During the winter of 1861 and early 1862 the town was significantly fortified by the Confederacy and served as a supply depot for both sides at various points in the war, and is famous for being the site of the construction of the first railroad ever built exclusively for military use, the Centreville Military Railroad. Centreville was of significant strategic value due to its proximity to several important roads, while its position atop a high ridge provided a commanding view of the surrounding area. The town was frequently associated with Confederate Colonel John S. Mosby, whose partisan rangers used its hillsides and farms as a base of operations, leading to the sobriquet "Mosby's Confederacy".

Modern

In 1943, Centreville was a small town. As in much of Northern Virginia, Centreville experienced sustained population growth in the 1990s and 2000s.
In 2021, the town has grown significantly. There are numerous shopping centers built around the town center.

Geography

Centreville is located at  (38.842470, −77.442621).

According to the United States Census Bureau (2010), the CDP has a total area of 12.04 square miles (31.2 km2), 99% of it land.

Climate
Like Washington D.C., Centreville features a mid-latitude, four seasons version of the humid subtropical climate (Köppen: Cfa), typical of the Mid-Atlantic region, including strong hot-summer humid continental climate (Köppen: Dfa) influences under the Köppen system. Winters are chilly and damp, with frost at night and some snow, while summers are hot and wet, with subtropical temperatures although these temperatures are hardly more bearable than in the south.

Demographics

As of the 2010 census, there is a population of 71,135 people and 25,516 households in the CDP. The population density was 5,908/sq mi people per square mile (2,281/km2). The racial makeup of the CDP was 57.0% White, 25.7% Asian, 13.4% Non-White Hispanic, 7.5% African American, 0.3% Native American, 0.1% Pacific Islander, and 4.4% from two or more races.

According to the 2000 census, there were 21,789 households, out of which 41.5% had children under the age of 18 living with them, 54.0% were married couples living together, 10.4% had a female householder with no husband present, and 32.0% were non-families. 21.5% of all households were made up of individuals, and 2.1% had someone living alone who was 65 years of age or older. The average household size was 2.74 and the average family size was 3.27.

In the CDP, the population was spread out, with 28.4% under the age of 18, 8.2% from 18 to 24, 43.7% from 25 to 44, 16.4% from 45 to 64, and 3.3% who were 65 years of age or older. The median age was 31 years. For every 100 females, there were 97.6 males. For every 100 females age 18 and over, there were 94.6 males.

According to a 2007 estimate, the median income for a household in the CDP was $87,932, and the median income for a family was $105,803. Males had a median income of $70,123 versus $41,117 for females. The per capita income for the CDP was $40,878. About 2.0% of families and 1.0% of the population were below the poverty line, including 3.0% of those under age 18 and 1.7% of those age 65 or over.

Transportation 

Centreville is served by three major roads. U.S. Route 29, the main artery through the town, enters Centreville from the west. Virginia Route 28 enters from the south and interchanges with U.S. Route 29 in between Centreville's two main shopping centers. SR 620 (Braddock Road) has several stretches of pavement in Centreville. Interstate 66 comes from the south-west and interchanges with both routes before heading toward Washington, D.C. in the east or western Virginia. The three roads are part of an interesting, if not frustrating traffic pattern. Drivers heading north on SR 28 are able to exit onto Interstate 66 eastbound, but they must use a one-mile (1.6 km) stretch of US 29 to access the westbound side of the Interstate. Likewise, eastbound Interstate 66's Exit 53 only provides access to SR 28 northbound; one must use Exit 52 and the same stretch of US 29 to reach SR 28 south.

The area is served by several Fairfax Connector bus routes connecting to the Metrorail system: 640, 641, 642.

Notable people
Megan Ambuhl, former US Army soldier connected to Abu Ghraib torture and prisoner abuse
Corbyn Besson, member of the band Why Don't We, graduate of Centreville High School.
Chris Beatty, American football coach
Jayson Blair, former New York Times journalist accused of plagiarism; attended Centreville High School
David L. Brewer III, retired U.S. Navy admiral and former superintendent of the Los Angeles Unified School District
Mike Glennon, American football player; attended Westfield High School 
Sean Glennon, former American football player for Virginia Tech
Helon Habila, professor and author
Abul Hussam, inventor of the Sono arsenic filter and winner of the National Academy of Engineering 2007 Grainger Challenge Prize Gold Award
George Juskalian, decorated U.S. Army officer and veteran of World War II, the Vietnam War, and the Korean War
S.C. Megale, author and screenwriter
Will Montgomery, NFL football player; graduate of Centreville High School
Dustin Pague, professional mixed martial artist
Ludacris, American rapper and actor; attended Centreville High School for one year
Eddie Royal, wide receiver for the Chicago Bears; graduated from Westfield High School
Scott Secules, NFL football player
Brandon Snyder, MLB 1st round draft pick in 2005 by the Baltimore Orioles; attended Westfield High School
Ormond Stone, astronomer, mathematician, and educator who founded the Fairfax County Public Library 
Richard Taylor, professional American football player
William J. Thaler, experimental physicist
Don Warren, former professional American football player
Sebra Yen, figure skater

Education

Primary and secondary schools
Residents of Centreville are zoned to schools in the Fairfax County Public Schools.

Centreville has two middle schools, Liberty Middle School and Ormond Stone Middle School. Some Centreville middle school students also go to Rocky Run Middle School.

Centreville High School, which is located within the postal boundaries of Clifton, serves much of Centreville. Some of Centreville is served by Chantilly High School and by Westfield High School, the latter opening in 2000. Both Chantilly High School and Westfield High School are located in Chantilly.

The only high school still within Centreville proper is Mountain View Alternative High School. It occupies the building formerly used by Centreville Elementary School.

Although a Loudoun County school, Cardinal Ridge Elementary has a Centreville address.

Public libraries

Fairfax County Public Library operates the Centreville Regional Library in the CDP.

Nearby towns, communities, etc. 
 Chantilly-South Riding (1 mile NW)
 Clifton (5 miles SE)
 Oakton 
 Fair Lakes (4.5 miles E)
 Manassas (6 miles S)

Notes

External links

 Why is it named Centreville?

References

Census-designated places in Fairfax County, Virginia
Census-designated places in Virginia
Washington metropolitan area
Populated places established in 1792
1792 establishments in Virginia